Michael Jackson: Searching for Neverland is an American biographical television film based on the 2014 book, Remember the Time: Protecting Michael Jackson in His Final Days, written by Jackson's personal bodyguards Bill Whitfield and Javon Beard. The film dramatizes Jackson in the final years of his life.

Synopsis
The film is told from the point of view of one of Michael Jackson's bodyguards Bill Whitfield (portrayed by Chad Coleman). It begins in December 2006 when Jackson returns from Bahrain and is now living in a Las Vegas mansion. He doesn't want to return to Neverland after the police raid from years earlier and instead plans to purchase a multi-million-dollar estate in Las Vegas he called “Wonderland.” With Jackson in serious debt, he agrees to do a residency just like Celine Dion.
Bill Whitfield says, "He [Jackson] hadn't worked in years. He spent tons of money on lawsuits, legal fees, shopping, and family. Money was his issue." The two bodyguards haven't been paid in months. Shortly before signing with AEG for his residency in London, Jackson hires Nation of Islam bodyguards for his protection. He then begins rehearsing in Los Angeles for his London residency.

Cast
Navi as Michael Jackson, King of Pop and late father of Prince, Paris and Blanket
Chad L. Coleman as Bill Whitfield, Jackson's head of security
Sam Adegoke as Javon Beard, Jackson's second bodyguard
Aidan Hanlon Smith as Prince Jackson, Jackson's eldest son
Taegen Burns as Paris Jackson, Jackson's middle daughter
Michael Mourra as Blanket Jackson, Jackson's youngest son
Richard Lawson as Joe Jackson, Jackson's father and Prince, Paris and Blanket's grandfather
Starletta DuPois as Katherine Jackson, Jackson's mother and Prince, Paris and Blanket's grandmother
Kristofer Gordon as Randy Jackson, Jackson's younger brother
Isabella Hofmann as Green, Randy's, somewhat, girlfriend (who was present with Randy at the incident on the night of Elizabeth Taylor's birthday).
Nondumiso Temble as Grace Rwaramba, Jackson's nanny
Ken Colquitt as Conrad Murray, the doctor who looked after Jackson's daughter (and later "killed" him in 2009)
Holly Robinson Peete as Raymone Bain, Virginia hotel manager

Development
On January 13, 2017, Lifetime announced that it had ordered a television biopic of Michael Jackson, which would be based on the book Remember the Time: Protecting Michael Jackson in His Final Days. Production was scheduled to begin in February in Los Angeles.

Reception
On its premiere airing, the film was watched by 2 million viewers.

References

External links
 

2017 films
2017 television films
2017 documentary films
Films set in 2006
Films set in 2007
Films set in 2008
Films set in 2009
American biographical films
American documentary television films
Biographical films about Michael Jackson
2010s American films